The International Centre for Financial Regulation (ICFR) (2009–12) was a UK-based non-partisan organisation focused entirely on financial regulation that operated between 2009 and 2012.

History
IFCR was the product of a collaboration between a number if international financial services institutions and the UK Government. The ICFR wanted to provide research, events and training on financial regulation whilst also acting as a catalyst for dialogue, thought leadership and scholarship in this critical area. The ICFR’s stated focus was to "shape regulatory thinking that not only addresses – but also anticipates – the evolution of financial markets at a global level, to bring consistency and cooperation between global regulators and policy makers through pro-active discussions, working groups and long-term research." The Centre also meant to support practical training initiatives on best practice and the latest regulatory changes both in developed and emerging markets.

It was put into administration in late 2012, as a member of the management had been suspended after a "substantial" sum of money "appeared to have been removed from the organisation’s bank accounts" without the permission of the centre's board.

On 21 January 2014, the ICFR's Chief Operating Officer Charles Taylor appeared at City of London Magistrates' Court charged with fraud by abuse of position in relation to the internal theft of almost £600,000 and false accounting.  Taylor committed suicide in September 2015.

Structure
Board members
 David Currie – Chairman
 Barbara Ridpath – Chief Executive
 Non-Executive Directors: Michel Prada, Stuart Overend, Charles Taylor

Stakeholders of the ICFR
 Aberdeen Asset Management
 Aviva
 Barclays Bank Plc
 Citigroup
 Goldman Sachs International
 HSBC
 JP Morgan
 Bank of America Merrill Lynch
 Morgan Stanley
 Prudential plc
 Standard Chartered
 3i
 UBS
 City of London Corporation
 Her Majesty’s Government
 PriceWaterhouseCoopers
 KPMG
 Ernst & Young
 Deloitte
 Clifford Chance

References

Further reading
 Kitty Ussher announces the establishment of the ICFR
 ICFR's Director of Research's comment entitled: "Obama proposes measures to restrict size and activity of major banks"

See also
 International Organization of Securities Commissions
 Centre for the Study of Financial Innovation
 New Financial

External links
 ICFR website

Financial regulation